Dinosaur Ridge is a ridge in Colorado, United States.

Dinosaur Ridge may also refer to:

 Dinosaur Ridge (Gangwon), a ridge in Gangwon-do, South Korea
 Dinosaur Ridge (Alberta), a ridge in Alberta, Canada